Viktor Viktorovich Manakov (born 9 June 1992) is a Russian professional racing cyclist, who currently rides for UCI Continental team . His parents Viktor Manakov and Jolanta Polikevičiūtė, and his aunt Rasa Polikevičiūtė were all professional cyclists.

At the 2007 European Youth Summer Olympic Festival, Manakov represented Lithuania, but later switched to internationally compete for Russia.

Major results

Road

2009
 7th Overall Tour de Lorraine Juniors
1st Stage 2
 7th Overall Peace Race Juniors
2010
 4th Overall La Coupe du Président de la Ville de Grudziądz
1st Stage 1a (TTT)
2011
 6th Tallinn–Tartu GP
2012
 1st Stage 5 Grand Prix of Adygeya
2013
 2nd Time trial, National Under-23 Road Championships
 8th Trofeo Palma
2014
 6th Chrono Champenois
2015
 6th Overall Bałtyk–Karkonosze Tour
2018
 4th Overall Five Rings of Moscow
 5th Time trial, National Road Championships
 5th Overall Bałtyk–Karkonosze Tour
2019
 1st Stage 3b (TTT) Vuelta Ciclista a Costa Rica
2020
 3rd Time trial, National Road Championships

Track

2009
 1st  Team pursuit, UCI Juniors Track World Championships
 1st  Team pursuit, UEC European Junior Track Championships
2010
 UEC European Junior Track Championships
1st  Individual pursuit
3rd  Omnium
 3rd  Individual pursuit, UCI Junior Track Cycling World Championships
2011
 3rd  Team pursuit, UEC European Track Championships
2012
 UEC European Under-23 Track Championships
1st  Omnium
1st  Team pursuit
2013
 1st  Omnium, UEC European Track Championships
 National Track Championships
1st  Omnium
1st  Madison (with Ivan Savitskiy)
2nd Team pursuit
2014
 UEC European Under-23 Track Championships
2nd  Omnium
2nd  Team pursuit
 3rd  Omnium, UCI Track Cycling World Championships
2015
 1st  Omnium, 2015–16 UCI Track Cycling World Cup, Cali
2017
 3rd  Madison, 2016–17 UCI Track Cycling World Cup, Cali (with Andrey Sazanov)

References

External links

1992 births
Living people
Russian male cyclists
Cyclists from Saint Petersburg
Russian people of Lithuanian descent